The Illawarra escarpment, or officially the Illawarra Range, is the fold-created cliffs and plateau-eroded outcrop mountain range west of the Illawarra coastal plain south of Sydney, in the state of New South Wales, Australia. The range encloses the Illawarra region which stretches from Stanwell Park in the north to Kiama, Gerringong and the Shoalhaven River in the south.

History

The escarpment or scarp was created between 225 and 280 million years ago and since eroded by creeks to its present height around 30 million years ago. Most of it is sandstone, with many Hawkesbury sandstone boulders and ledges visible in addition to the actual cliffs. Its maximum heights are reached in the south, west of Albion Park at Knights Hill, and Mount Murray, . This forms the eastern edge of the Southern Highlands plateau, uplifted along with the Blue Mountains around 70 million years ago.

Many of the towns on the coastal plain adjacent to the escarpment were first founded to harvest the cedar trees on the slopes of the escarpment or the coal seams beneath it. With the original logging industry of the area came the need for passes over the escarpment, creating such ones as Rixons Pass, Bulli Pass, O'Briens Road and Macquarie Pass. The city of Wollongong is the central city in the Illawarra.

Flora and fauna
The escarpment contains a wide variety of native flora and fauna and is a haven for many forms of wildlife.

It is known for the Illawarra Flame Tree with its bright foliage, as well as rare surviving red cedar trees that haven't been logged. On Saddleback Mountain and at Minnamurra Rainforest and other places there are remnant localities of rainforest bushland, as well as, to the north, dry sclerophyll forests. The southern typical bush meets the northern at Mount Kembla, creating a unique effect.

Many native species thrive here such as wallabies, brushtail possums and gliding possums, frogs, goannas, brush turkeys, flying foxes, snakes, bower birds, glossy black cockatoos and other colourful parrots, owls and native birds of prey.

The area also has many introduced species including fallow deer, red deer, rabbits, feral cats and red foxes. It also acts as a significant haven for species that have been affected by environmental disturbances such as development and bushfire. There are currently 12 threatened animal species in the area.

The escarpment also contains many historic sites such as mine entrances and passes.

Endangered ecological community

The escarpment contains the Illawarra Escarpment Subtropical Rainforest (S_RF01) ecological community, which has been declared an endangered ecological community, under the New South Wales TSC Act.

Geography

The Cambewarra Range is considered a separate, yet related, geological formation that continues around the Noorinan promontory and continues around Kangaroo Valley.

It is mostly of hard sandstone, with outcrops like Mount Keira and Mount Kembla rising above . There are many tracks to the top of such summits including the southern tip of the escarpment, Saddleback Mountain and Noorinan Mountain promontory. The flora ranges from northern and southern eucalypts and at Mount Kembla fuses, providing an interesting phenomena. The range has much history, including Hoddles Track which used to go to Bowral from Kiama.

Passes
There are several passes over the escarpment: 
 At Bald Hill, where Lawrence Hargrave Drive descends into Stanwell Park;
 At Bulli, where the road goes down from Bulli Pass Lookout near Sublime Point Lookout, around a tight bend and then down into the town of Thirroul;
 At Rixons Pass where the road descends around several tight curves just north of Brokers Nose promontory, and is now a management trail used for mountain biking; 
 At Mount Ousley Road, now a freeway, the main route is used for the majority of vehicular traffic and is designed to accommodate slower-moving trucks and buses; 
 At Mount Keira Road, built by convict labour and still, in a slightly changed form, used today; 
 At O'Briens Road, now partially used by Harry Graham Drive, the Mount Nebo section now a walking and riding track; 
 At Macquarie Pass, west of Albion Park, protected by a national park; and
 At Jamberoo Mountain Road Pass, east of the mountain of that name, which climbs through a winding pattern to the summit and along the escarpment to Knights Hill and beyond west. 
 West of Albion Park is Caloola Pass, passes below Knights Hill and descends to Yellow Rock west of Albion Park, a proposed alternate route to Macquarie Pass, Not used since WWII. Still walk-able
 Between Dapto and Albion Park, Johnsons Spur which has not been used since the establishment of Macquarie Pass. Was the main access route from the Illawarra to the Southern Tablelands, not only walk-able

Saddleback Mountain Road only reaches the summit after a short, steep, turnoff, but was once part of Hoddles Track, which is now only in existence in a small ridge track from the summit but used to extend west to the Southern Highlands.

Protected areas
Numerous areas are protected as part of the Illawarra Escarpment State Conservation Area or as state forests such as Kembla State Forest southwest of Wollongong. However, much is private property or owned by mining companies like BHP. Well known and popular lookouts such as at Mount Keira and Bald Hill are reserves or parks, the Mount Keira Summit Park is an annexe of the Wollongong Botanic Garden like Puckeys Estate Reserve on the plain.

Walking tracks
There are many walking tracks and lookouts with views of the surrounding countryside to the south, or suburbs to the north and coastal villages to the far north, and bushland and suburbs to the north. There are several well-known lookouts, such as Bald Hill, Bulli Pass, Sublime Point and Mount Keira, as well as lesser known tracks with views such as Hoddles Track west of Saddleback Mountain. Some tracks have gone into disrepair such as the Wodi Wodi track at Stanwell Park, but some such as the Mount Keira Ring Track have been upgraded. Weed infestation is a problem, with many areas invaded by lantana and other invasive weeds.

Maddens Plains
The "address locality" of Maddens Plains is defined as a suburb of the City of Wollongong, "about 1 km N of Scarborough and about 7 km E of Southend [trig] Station". There is a group of telecommunications antennae, including amateur radio repeaters.

See also

 List of mountains of New South Wales

References

R.W. Young (1980–1984)"The Illawarra Escarpment", Wollongong Studies in Geography No. 2 Department of Geography, University of Wollongong

External links

"Illawarra Coal" – An unofficial history of coal mining in the Illawarra
Northern Illawarra Community Web Portal
 

 
Mountain ranges of New South Wales
Tourist attractions in New South Wales
Geography of Wollongong
Plateaus of Australia
Endangered ecological communities
Tourist attractions in Wollongong